The 2007–08 LEN Euroleague was the 45th edition of LEN's premier competition for men's water polo clubs. It ran from 26 September 2007 to 10 May 2008, and was contested by 42 teams. The Final Four (semifinals, final, and third place game) took place on May 9 and May 10 in Barcelona. The winning team was Pro Recco from Italy.

Qualifying round 1

Group A (Istanbul)

Preliminary round

Group A

Group B

Group C

Group D

Knockout stage

Quarter-finals
The first legs were played on 26 March, and the second legs were played on 9 April 2008.

|}

Final Four (Barcelona)
Piscina Municipal de Montjuïc, Barcelona, Spain

Final standings

LEN Champions League seasons
Champions League
2007 in water polo
2008 in water polo